Praemastus albipuncta is a moth in the subfamily Arctiinae. It was described by George Hampson in 1901. It is found in Venezuela.

References

Moths described in 1901
Arctiinae
Arctiinae of South America